Horotiu is a small township on the west bank of the Waikato River in the Waikato District of New Zealand. From early in the 20th century it developed around a freezing works and other industries.

The North Island Main Trunk railway runs through the town, as did State Highway 1 until opening of part of the Waikato Expressway in 2013. An hourly bus runs between Huntly and Hamilton.

Name 
The name, Horotiu, seems to have been used interchangeably with Waikato River, or Pukete. Its first use for the current township seems to occur in 1864, shortly after the invasion of the Waikato. Until then, Horotiu was the name of the upper Waikato river, where its current became faster and of Horotiu pā, on its banks, near Cambridge. An 1858 map only shows the name as Horotiu Plains in the area near the pā. The name, Horotiu, for the Waikato River, upstream from Ngāruawāhia, seems to have remained in use until the 1920s, though the 1859 map named it as Waikato.

The railway station changed its name on 23 June 1907, when the proposed post office was referred to as Horotiu (Pukete), and the name of the school was changed from Pukete to Horotiu in 1911. The post office closed in 1988.

Demographics 

Horotiu had a population of 624 at the 2018 New Zealand census, an increase of 126 people (25.3%) since the 2013 census, and an increase of 111 people (21.6%) since the 2006 census. There were 198 households, comprising 324 males and 300 females, giving a sex ratio of 1.08 males per female. The median age was 34.8 years (compared with 37.4 years nationally), with 150 people (24.0%) aged under 15 years, 114 (18.3%) aged 15 to 29, 306 (49.0%) aged 30 to 64, and 54 (8.7%) aged 65 or older.

Ethnicities were 78.4% European/Pākehā, 34.1% Māori, 3.8% Pacific peoples, 6.2% Asian, and 1.9% other ethnicities. People may identify with more than one ethnicity.

The percentage of people born overseas was 8.2, compared with 27.1% nationally.

Although some people chose not to answer the census's question about religious affiliation, 64.9% had no religion, 23.1% were Christian, 0.5% had Māori religious beliefs, 1.4% were Buddhist and 1.4% had other religions.

Of those at least 15 years old, 66 (13.9%) people had a bachelor's or higher degree, and 108 (22.8%) people had no formal qualifications. The median income was $40,900, compared with $31,800 nationally. 78 people (16.5%) earned over $70,000 compared to 17.2% nationally. The employment status of those at least 15 was that 291 (61.4%) people were employed full-time, 51 (10.8%) were part-time, and 9 (1.9%) were unemployed.

In 2018 the census unit was reduced to about half its previous area, losing most to the west of the railway to Te Kowhai area unit. Growth to 1,390 is planned by 2040.

Geology 

Taupō Pumice Alluvium (Q1a) was deposited on the Hinuera Formation (Q2a) until about 15,000 years ago. Some of the alluvium has been dug for sand and gravel. The Hinuera formation is also sand and gravel, interbedded with silt and some peat. In the last 14,000 years the Waikato River has cut into these formations, forming a low terrace and then cutting deeper.

History 

Ngāti Hauā had a  pā named Horotiu near Cambridge and they also had land in this area. The 1858 census put the Ngāti Hauā population at 1,399. By then they had seeded this area with European grasses. Their land was confiscated in 1864.

Education 

The school dates back to 1879, following a government grant of the land in 1878.

Horotiu also has a playcentre.

Freezing works and dairy 
Auckland Farmers Cooperative (later Allied Farmers – AFFCO) bought  in 1914 and a riverside gravel pit in 1915. Horotiu Freezing Works opened on 17 January 1916. Horotiu still has AFFCO’s head office and its largest beef processing plant. The parent company, Talley's, opened a Waikato Dairy Co dried milk plant on the same site in August 2018. The area has long been associated with dairying, a casein factory having opened in 1919. AFFCO has long been involved with strikes and pollution.

Business park 

Ports of Auckland have 33ha in Northgate for a freight hub.

Gravel, landfill and power station 
By 1904 the area was recognised as a source of gravel and pits were established by 1907, especially on the east bank, and continue to produce aggregates and take in clean fill. Other landfilling ended in 2006, when a 1999 consent for a Hamilton City Council landfill expired. It had been started in October 1985 on a  sand pit (worked from about 1970 to 2000) and was replaced by Hampton Downs. It was closed earlier than originally planned, due to leachate problems. The 1999 consent required use of a vacuum to extract gas from the bores and leachate. Therefore, from November 2004 until 2012, when the emissions declined, methane from the landfill ran a 900kWe Waukesha VHP5904LTD Enginator gas engine generator set.

Cycleway 
The Horotiu-Pukete section of Te Awa River Ride opened in 2013 and an extension to Ngāruawāhia opened on 2 November 2017.

Bridges 
Near Horotiu the Waikato is bridged by 2 roads and Te Awa cycleway.

The next bridge upstream is Pukete sewer bridge and downstream, Ngāruawāhia road bridge.

1921 Horotiu Bridge Rd 
It was designed by Toogood and Jones, of Auckland, for £7900, paid by Waikato and Waipa County Councils, though government contributed £1,728. The bridge was completed in 1921, though the approaches took longer.

2001 Horotiu Bridge Rd 
The Category II listed bridge was deemed unsafe and replaced in 2001.

Annual average daily traffic flows were 3,565 in 2010, 4,432 in 2016 and 5,969 in 2018, of which about 12% were heavy vehicles.

2013 Waikato Expressway bridge 
Concrete pre-cast panels were added to them to carry the concrete deck and barriers.

Annual average daily traffic flows 3.46 km south of Gordonton Rd Overbridge were -

2017 cycleway 

The Te Awa cycle bridge is a 140m long, 2.5m wide, $1.3m cable network arch bridge, opened on Thursday 2 November 2017. The bridge is lit from a 9kWh battery, powered by 2 x 100 watt wind turbines and 2 x 250 watt solar panels on 7-metre high masts at the base of the bridge. Since opening the average weekly use by cyclists rose from 133 to 711 and by walkers from 348 to 391.

See also 
 Horotiu Railway Station

References

External links 
 Horotiu on 1:50,000 map
 Horotiu on Google Street View
 Horotiu school
 Waikato River swimming water quality and LAWA water quality
 National Library aerial photos 1930 (works), 1955 (bridge, town, station, works), 1959 (town, station and works), 1963 (bridge, town, works), 1979 (works)
 Facebook video of placing of cycle bridge

Populated places in Waikato
Waikato District
Populated places on the Waikato River